Alexander Martin Lippisch (November 2, 1894 – February 11, 1976) was a German aeronautical engineer, a pioneer of aerodynamics who made important contributions to the understanding of tailless aircraft, delta wings and the ground effect, and also worked in the U.S. Within the Opel-RAK program, he was the designer of the world's first rocket-powered glider.

He developed and conceptualized delta wing designs which functioned practically in supersonic delta wing fighter aircraft as well as in hang gliders. People he worked with continued the development of the delta wing and supersonic flight concepts over the 20th century. His most famous designs are the Messerschmitt Me 163 rocket-powered interceptor and the Dornier Aerodyne.

Early life
Lippisch was born in Munich, Kingdom of Bavaria.  He later recalled that his interest in aviation began with a demonstration conducted by Orville Wright over Tempelhof Field in Berlin in September 1909.  Nonetheless, he planned to follow his father's footsteps into art school, until the outbreak of World War I intervened.  During his service with the German Army, between 1915–1918, Lippisch had the chance to fly being an aerial photographer and mapper.

Early aircraft designs
Following the war, Lippisch worked with the Zeppelin Company, and it was at this time that he first became interested in tailless aircraft. In 1921, his first design to be  built, by his friend Gottlob Espenlaub, was the Espenlaub E-2 glider. This was the beginning of a research programme that would result in some fifty designs throughout the 1920s and 1930s. Lippisch's growing reputation saw him appointed in 1925 to director of the Rhön-Rossitten Gesellschaft (RRG), a glider organisation including research groups and construction facilities.

Lippisch also designed conventional gliders at this time, including the Wien of 1927 and its successor the Fafnir of 1930. In 1928, partaking in the Opel-RAK program by Fritz von Opel and Max Valier, Lippisch's tail-first Ente (Duck) was equipped with powder rockets by Friedrich Wilhelm Sander's company and became the first aircraft to fly under rocket power. From 1927, he resumed his tailless work, leading to a series of designs named Storch I – Storch IX (Stork I-IX), mostly gliders. These designs attracted little interest from the government and private industry.

Delta wing designs
Experience with the Storch series led Lippisch to concentrate increasingly on delta-winged designs. The Delta I was the world's first tailless delta wing aircraft to fly (in 1931). This interest resulted in five aircraft, numbered Delta I – Delta V, which were built between 1931 and 1939. In 1933, RGG had been reorganised into the Deutsche Forschungsanstalt für Segelflug (German Institute for Sailplane Flight, DFS) and the Delta IV and Delta V were designated as the DFS 39 and DFS 40 respectively.

World War II projects
In early 1939, the Reichsluftfahrtsministerium (RLM, Reich Aviation Ministry) transferred Lippisch and his team to work at the Messerschmitt factory in Augsburg, in order to design a high-speed fighter aircraft around the rocket engines  then under development by Hellmuth Walter. The team quickly adapted their most recent design, the DFS 194, to rocket power, the first example successfully flying in early 1940. This successfully demonstrated the technology for what would become the Messerschmitt Me 163 Komet.

Although technically novel, the Komet did not prove to be a successful weapon and friction between Lippisch and Messerschmitt was frequent. In 1943, Lippisch transferred to Vienna's Aeronautical Research Institute (Luftfahrtforschungsanstalt Wien, LFW) in Wiener Neustadt, in an own design bureau to concentrate on the problems of high-speed flight. That same year, he was awarded a doctoral degree in engineering by the University of Heidelberg. With him came the mathematician Hermann Behrbohm on half time (and continued half time for Messerschmitt in Oberammergau to where the development activities were moved into the underground facility after the  air raids on Augsburg the 25 February 1944).

Wind tunnel research in 1939 had suggested that the delta wing was a good choice for supersonic flight, and Lippisch set to work designing a supersonic, ramjet-powered fighter, the Lippisch P.13a. By the time the war ended, however, the project had only advanced as far as a development glider, the DM-1.

Importance for the delta wing and supersonic flight concepts
Even though the Lippisch P.13a never flew, it and Lippisch's research and development had a significant importance for the development of the delta wing and supersonic flight concepts and supersonic-delta wing-fighter aircraft. 

All this later development being funded by governments in the 1950s (like the Swedish Defence Act of 1958) to meet the need to be able to swiftly attack strategic nuclear weapons-bombers such as the Tupolev Tu-16 before they reached their targets. Lippisch's delta wing concept proved to be very steady and efficient in very high speed supersonic flight. 

The research of the Messerschmitt and Lippisch offices were continued by:
 Lippisch continued work at Convair after he immigrated to the US. 
 Hermann Behrbohm worked for the BEE (French Aerodynamic Research and Development Institute) from 1946 on with operations in Emmendingen and Weil am Rhein in the French occupation zone in Germany. His research was used in the later French developedment of the Dassault Mirage. 
 Hermann Behrbohm worked for Saab, Linköping, Sweden from 1951 on, where he made significant contributions to the Saab 35 Draken and Saab 37 Viggen supersonic-delta wing-fighter aircraft, developing the delta wing and supersonic flight concepts. Bertil Dillner worked on the concepts with Behrbohm at Saab. 
 Bertil Dillner immigrated to the US 1967 and started working for Boeing Commercial Airplanes in Seattle at the supersonic Boeing 2707 SST passenger jet in 1967-1972 and the aerodynamics of hypersonic aviation at the re-entry of the Space Shuttle. Dillner was chief aerodynamic engineer at Boeing Commercial Airplanes from 1972 to 1981. Dillner became aerodynamic chief engineer 1981-1985 for Boeing Defense, Space & Security in Seattle and chief engineer 1985-1988 until his retirement.

Postwar work in the United States
Like many German scientists, Lippisch was taken to the United States after the war under Operation Paperclip. He worked at the White Sands Missile Range.

Convair
Advances in jet engine design were making Lippisch's ideas more practical, and Convair became interested in a hybrid (mixed power) jet/rocket design which they proposed as the F-92. In order to gain experience with the delta wing handling at high speeds, they first built a test aircraft, the 7002 which, on June 9, 1948, became the first jet-powered delta-wing aircraft to fly. Although the U.S. Air Force lost interest in the F-92, the next test model 7003 was designated the XF-92A. This led Convair to proposing delta wing for most of their projects through the 1950s and into the 1960s, including the F-102 Delta Dagger, F-106 Delta Dart and B-58 Hustler.

Ground effect aircraft
From 1950–1964, Lippisch worked for the Collins Radio Company in Cedar Rapids, Iowa, which had an aeronautical division. It was during this time that his interest shifted toward ground effect craft. The results were an unconventional VTOL aircraft (eventually becoming the Dornier Aerodyne) and an aerofoil boat research seaplane X-112, flown in 1963. However, Lippisch contracted cancer, and resigned from Collins.

When he recovered in 1966, he formed his own research company, Lippisch Research Corporation, and attracted the interest of the West German government. Prototypes for both the aerodyne and the ground-effect craft RFB X-113 (1970) then RFB X-114 (1977) were built, but no further development was undertaken. The Kiekhaefer Mercury company was also interested in his ground-effect craft and successfully tested one of his designs as the Aeroskimmer, but also eventually lost interest.

Death and legacy
Lippisch died in Cedar Rapids on February 11, 1976. In 1985, he was inducted into the International Air & Space Hall of Fame at the San Diego Air & Space Museum.

Some Lippisch designs 
 Lippisch SG-38 Zögling, 1926
 DFS 39, tailless research aircraft
 DFS 40, tailless research aircraft
 DFS 193, experimental aircraft
 DFS 194, rocket-powered research aircraft, forerunner of Me 163
 Lippisch P.01-111, designed during 'Projekt X', which would eventually culminate in the Messerschmitt Me 163 Komet.
 Lippisch Li P.04, a tailless airplane designed as a competitor to the Messerschmitt Me 329
 Lippisch Li P.10, 1942 tailless bomber design
 Lippisch P.11, designed to compete with the Horten Ho-IX; the latter went on to become the Horten (Gotha) Ho-(Go-)229.
 Messerschmitt Me 163 Komet
 Lippisch P.13, 1943 push-pull bomber design
 Lippisch P.13a, a unique delta-winged, ramjet-powered interceptor.
 Lippisch P.13b, a unique airplane powered by a rotating fuel-table of lignite, owing to the fuel shortages late in World War 2 in Germany.
 Lippisch P.15, a development of the Messerschmitt Me 163 Komet.
 Lippisch P.20, a development of the P.15.
 Dornier Aerodyne, a 1972 VTOL testbed

See also 
 Delta wing
 Supersonic flight
 Hermann Behrbohm
 Willy Messerschmitt
 Bertil Dillner
 German inventors and discoverers
 John Carver Meadows Frost
 Space Shuttle

References

External links 

Lecture on aerodynamics by Dr. Lippisch
Alexander Lippisch Digital Collection
Alexander Lippisch Papers (archives)

1894 births
1976 deaths
Aerodynamicists
Bavarian emigrants to the United States
German aerospace engineers
German Army personnel of World War I
German people of World War II
Messerschmitt people
Operation Paperclip
Engineers from Munich
People from the Kingdom of Bavaria
Recipients of the Knights Cross of the War Merit Cross
Aircraft designers
German emigrants to the United States